Jonathan Rommelmann (born 18 December 1994) is a German rower.

He won a medal at the 2019 World Rowing Championships.

References

External links

1994 births
Living people
German male rowers
Sportspeople from Mülheim
World Rowing Championships medalists for Germany
Rowers at the 2020 Summer Olympics
Medalists at the 2020 Summer Olympics
Olympic medalists in rowing
Olympic silver medalists for Germany